Nancy Alice Edward Eaton (May 28, 1961 – January 21, 1985) was a Canadian heiress and a member of the prominent Eaton family. She was the great-great-granddaughter of Timothy Eaton, founder of Eaton's department stores. She was the only daughter of Edward Eaton and Nancy Leigh (Gossage) Eaton of Toronto.

Murder
On January 21, 1985, Eaton was stabbed twenty-one times and then raped in her Farnham Street apartment  in Toronto. An acquaintance of Eaton's, Ernest John Andrew Leyshon-Hughes, also known as Andrew Leyshon-Hughes, who was himself a member of the prominent Canadian Osler family, admitted to murdering her, but was found not guilty by reason of insanity. He was indefinitely remanded to the custody of The Ontario Review Board. In February 2001, Leyshon-Hughes was living at the Royal Ottawa Hospital and was a student at Algonquin College.
In 2005, Leyshon-Hughes was discharged from the psychiatric hospital into the community.

In popular culture
In 2003, the television movie The Death and Life of Nancy Eaton was released. Jessica Paré played the part of Nancy. It airs on LMN in the United States and is based on the book A Question of Guilt by William Scoular. As of 2018 the movie was released online on Encore+.

References

See also
Eaton family
Britton Bath Osler
Edmund Boyd Osler (Ontario politician)
William Osler

Nancy Eaton
1961 births
1985 deaths
1985 murders in Canada
Canadian murder victims
Canadian socialites
Deaths by stabbing in Canada
Female murder victims
People murdered in Toronto
Violence against women in Canada
1985 in Ontario
Crime in Toronto